Holmevatnet or Holmevatn is a lake in the Setesdalsheiene area of Norway. It is located in the mountains on the border of the municipalities of Bykle in Agder county and Suldal in Rogaland county. The  lake lies just west of the lake Store Urevatn and to the northeast of the lake Blåsjø.

See also
List of lakes in Aust-Agder
List of lakes in Norway

References

Lakes of Agder
Lakes of Rogaland
Suldal
Bykle